Arc Angels is the self-titled debut album by Arc Angels released in 1992.

Track listing
 "Living in a Dream" (Doyle Bramhall II, Charlie Sexton) – 4:54
 "Paradise Cafe" (Charlie Sexton, Tonio K) - 5:14
 "Sent by Angels" (Doyle Bramhall II)  – 5:44
 "Sweet Nadine" (Charlie Sexton, Tonio K)  – 4:31
 "Good Time" (Doyle Bramhall II, Sammy Piazza) – 4:47
 "See What Tomorrow Brings" (Doyle Bramhall II) – 6:27
 "Always Believed in You" (Charlie Sexton, Tonio K) – 4:55
 "The Famous Jane" (Charlie Sexton, Tonio K) – 4:31
 "Spanish Moon" (Doyle Bramhall II, Charlie Sexton, Chris Layton) – 5:48
 "Carry Me On" (Doyle Bramhall II)  – 4:09
 "Shape I'm In" (Doyle Bramhall II, Charlie Sexton, Marc Benno) – 4:07
 "Too Many Ways to Fall" (Chris Layton, Tommy Shannon, Charlie Sexton, Tonio K) – 5:52

Personnel
Doyle Bramhall II - guitar, vocals
Charlie Sexton - guitar, vocals
Chris Layton - drums
Tommy Shannon - bass
Ian McLagan - keyboards

Production
Produced by Little Steven & The Disciples of Soul
Engineered by Dave McNair

References

1992 debut albums
Albums produced by Steven Van Zandt
Arc Angels albums
Geffen Records albums